Derek Montgomery (born 5 May 1950) is an English former professional footballer who played as a midfielder.

Career
Born in Houghton-le-Spring, Montgomery joined Bradford City from Leeds United in July 1968. He made 4 league appearances for the club. He was released by the club in 1969, and later also played for Bedford Town.

Sources

References

1950 births
Living people
English footballers
Leeds United F.C. players
Bradford City A.F.C. players
Bedford Town F.C. players
English Football League players
Association football midfielders